Pouteria maclayana is a tree in the family Sapotaceae. The tree is named for Russian explorer and biologist Nicholas Miklouho-Maclay. Its habitat is forests from sea-level to  altitude. P. maclayana is found in Indonesia, Malaysian Borneo, Papua New Guinea, and the Solomon Islands.

References

maclayana
Plants described in 1942
Trees of Sumatra
Trees of Borneo
Trees of the Maluku Islands
Trees of Papua New Guinea
Trees of the Solomon Islands